Works is a compilation album of songs by British progressive rock band Pink Floyd, released in 1983. It features a variety of material, including two of the band's early singles, "Arnold Layne" and "See Emily Play," alternative mixes of tracks from The Dark Side of the Moon and the studio outtake "Embryo."

Release and contents

The album was released by Pink Floyd's former American label, Capitol Records, to compete with their then-current studio album The Final Cut. The album is particularly notable for including the track "Embryo," an outtake from the Ummagumma album that later became a concert staple in a greatly elongated form. Previously, the track had only appeared on a scarce various artists compilation album promoting Pink Floyd's UK label Harvest Records entitled Picnic – A Breath of Fresh Air in January 1970.

Also unique to Works are the tracks "Brain Damage" and "Eclipse," which are alternative stereo mixes, rumored to be "fold-down" mixes from the quadraphonic edition of Dark Side of the Moon. Additionally, some tracks are crossfaded into one another, such as "See Emily Play" into "Several Species..." and "Fearless" into "Brain Damage." The album also opens with a heartbeat similar to the opening of Dark Side of the Moon that fades into the wind intro of "One of These Days." This creates a bookend effect on side 1, which ends with the heartbeat fadeout of "Eclipse."

Cover
The cover art, illustrated by Ron Larson, was inspired by the c. 1948 poster "Nederland industrialiseert" ("The Netherlands industrialise"), designed by Dutch graphic artist Wladimir Flem.

Track listing
Side one
"One of These Days" – 5:50 (re-mix of the Meddle version, interpolates part of "Speak to Me" from The Dark Side of the Moon)
"Arnold Layne" – 2:52 (single, Duophonic Stereo)
"Fearless" – 6:08 (from Meddle)
"Brain Damage" – 3:50 (from The Dark Side of the Moon, alternate mix)
"Eclipse" – 1:45 (from The Dark Side of the Moon, alternate mix)

Side two
"Set the Controls for the Heart of the Sun" – 5:23 (from A Saucerful of Secrets)
"See Emily Play" – 2:54 (single, Duophonic Stereo)
"Several Species of Small Furry Animals Gathered Together in a Cave and Grooving with a Pict" – 4:47 (from Ummagumma)
"Free Four" – 4:07 (from Obscured by Clouds)
"Embryo" – 4:39 (from the various artists compilation Picnic – A Breath of Fresh Air)

Personnel
Syd Barrett — guitar ("Arnold Layne", "Set the Controls for the Heart of the Sun", "See Emily Play"), lead vocals ("Arnold Layne", "See Emily Play")
David Gilmour — guitar (all but "Arnold Layne", "See Emily Play", "Several Species of Small Furry Animals Gathered Together in a Cave and Grooving with a Pict"), bass guitar ("One of These Days"), lead vocals ("Fearless", "Embryo"), backing vocals
Nick Mason — drums, percussion, tape effects, vocalisations ("One of These Days")
Roger Waters — bass guitar, tape effects, lead vocals ("Brain Damage", "Eclipse", "Set the Controls for the Heart of the Sun", "Free Four"), vocalisations ("Several Species of Small Furry Animals Gathered Together in a Cave and Grooving with a Pict"), backing vocals
Richard Wright — keyboards, piano, synthesisers, backing vocals

Charts

References

Albums produced by David Gilmour
Albums produced by Joe Boyd
Albums produced by Nick Mason
Albums produced by Norman Smith (record producer)
Albums produced by Richard Wright (musician)
Albums produced by Roger Waters
Pink Floyd compilation albums
1983 compilation albums
Capitol Records compilation albums